John Frank Tesh (born July 9, 1952) is an American pianist and composer of pop music and a radio host and television presenter. He hosts the Intelligence for Your Life radio show. In addition, since 2014, he has hosted Intelligence for Your Life TV with his wife Connie Sellecca.

Tesh has won six Emmys, has four gold albums, two Grammy nominations, and an Associated Press award for investigative journalism. Tesh has sold over eight million records. His live concerts have raised more than $7 million for PBS. He wrote the NBA on NBC basketball theme "Roundball Rock". He has co-hosted the television program Entertainment Tonight. He has previously worked as a sportscaster and host for the Olympic Games, Wimbledon, the US Open, the Tour De France, Ironman Triathlon, and as a news anchor and reporter. In 2018, Tesh was inducted into the North Carolina Music Hall of Fame.

Early life
Tesh was born in Garden City, New York, on Long Island, the son of Mildred (Bunny), a nurse, and John F. Tesh, a textile chemist. He graduated from Garden City High School in 1970. Playing piano and trumpet from the age of six, he was named to the New York State Symphonic Orchestra in high school, while also playing the organ in a rock band. Tesh studied communications and music at North Carolina State University. He was also a "walk on" with the varsity lacrosse and soccer teams.

While at North Carolina State, studying physics and chemistry, he took a TV and radio course. Tesh worked part-time reading later the news for Rick Dees at WKIX (AM) Raleigh in 1974. His roommate, Bill Leslie, anchor at WRAL-TV, helped him get into the radio and TV field. While in the area, Tesh worked as a news anchor in Raleigh, Orlando, Nashville, then moving to WCBS-TV in New York; this portion of his career spanned 12 years.

Career

Entertainment Tonight and television career
His television career included a stint as a news anchor and reporter at WSM-TV (now WSMV-TV) in Nashville, Tennessee, in the 1970s, where he often covered the same stories as Oprah Winfrey, who worked at a competing Nashville station. From Nashville, Tesh shuffled to WTVD in Durham, North Carolina, then down to WFTV in Orlando, and finally up to New York's WCBS-TV, where, at age 22, he was their youngest reporter. In the fall of 1978, Tesh was a roving reporter for CBS during the 1978 New York City Marathon, which he ran and completed in 3:51:56. However, he became more well known when he co-hosted the television show Entertainment Tonight from 1986 to 1996.

Tesh also served as a sportscaster for CBS and later NBC, anchoring events such as the Tour de France bicycle race from 1983 through 1986 (Tesh has the distinction of being the anchor for the first American broadcast of this event), the US Open, and gymnastics at the 1992 and 1996 Summer Olympics.

Tesh hosted the short-lived One on One with John Tesh talk show in 1991–92 on NBC daytime, and co-hosted the show John & Leeza From Hollywood with fellow Entertainment Tonight personality Leeza Gibbons from 1993 to 1994, also on NBC daytime. In 2014, Tesh returned to syndicated television in the series Intelligence for Your Life TV, based on his radio show.

Tesh appeared in "The Icarus Factor", an episode of Star Trek: The Next Generation, playing a Klingon warrior. He also appeared as himself in a 1987 episode of the daytime serial Santa Barbara.

Musical career
In 1987, Yanni was putting together his first touring band to promote his album Out of Silence, as well as selections from Keys to Imagination. Being good friends, Tesh asked Yanni if he could join the band as keyboardist along with Joyce Imbesi and drummer Charlie Adams, as he'd never been onstage for a live performance, and he needed the experience. Despite already having a full-time job with Entertainment Tonight, and the long hours of rehearsal for the band, he did very well, although he did only one tour with Yanni, playing in about 12 shows, including the "1988 Concert Series", before being replaced by Bradley Joseph. Later, Yanni helped Tesh get his first recording contract with Private Music.

In the 1990s, John Tesh was credited with the theme music to Bobby's World, hosted by Howie Mandel, and the NBA on NBC theme, known as "Roundball Rock". Tesh composed the NBA on NBC theme after an idea hit him while traveling. In order to recall his idea at a later juncture, Tesh recorded the initial beat vocally on his answering machine, by ringing his home phone and leaving a message for himself. The theme was used for the NBA on NBC before the network stopped carrying NBA games following the 2001–02 season (as well as an electric guitar-driven spinoff that was used on NBC's WNBA telecasts from 1997 to 2002), though NBC would revive the theme for its basketball coverage during the 2008 Summer Olympics. Tesh would later license the song to Fox Sports for its college basketball coverage.

In August 1994, John performed at the Red Rocks Amphitheatre in Morrison, Colorado, for his first Live at Red Rocks concert. Tesh performed with conductor John Bisharat and the 70-piece Colorado Symphony Orchestra. The concert featured Tesh playing grand piano, Charlie Bisharat playing electric violin, and Everette Harp playing alto saxophone. Also featured were Olympic gold medal-gymnasts Nadia Comaneci (1976) and Bart Conner (1984) performing gymnastic routines specially-choreographed to Tesh's music.

After Tesh left his ten-year job as co-host for Entertainment Tonight in 1996, he turned to his career as a contemporary keyboardist. This led to him starting The John Tesh Radio Show in 2003.

John Tesh Radio Show and spin-offs
Tesh currently has a nationally syndicated radio show called the John Tesh Radio Show, which typically airs on adult contemporary, classic hits, Christian and soft rock radio formats. The music is interspersed with various factoids and other information Tesh considers useful to listeners, often with topics such as health and well-being.

These factoids are called "Intelligence for Your Life", played on radio stations across the United States and Canada, and the Armed Forces Network. Select pieces of "Intelligence for Your Life" are broken up and distributed in vignette form to other radio stations (including talk radio formats) and for use on morning shows. There is also a three-hour weekend show, "Intelligence for Your Health", launched in 2010, hosted by Connie Sellecca.

Across all of its versions, Tesh's radio programs reach listeners across the United States, Canada, and United Kingdom, placing it on the list of most-listened-to radio programs. Tesh's main rival is Delilah, and these two shows are sometimes aired in the same market on competing stations, or occasionally on the same stations in differing time slots.

The show started as a weekend show in 2000 on Clear Channel's KKDJ-FM/Bakersfield and then a few other stations, expanding to a daily version in 2003. The program was originally syndicated by Westwood One under the name On the Air with John Tesh, albeit with a slightly different format. It is produced by Tesh with a staff of 35 and still distributed by syndicator Westwood One. In September 2016, the partnership with Westwood One was renewed in a new multi-year agreement. At the time, Westwood One indicated that it was airing on 280 radio stations. As of 2022, the programs are distributed through a partnership with Compass Media Networks.

In late 2014, a television version of these factoids, Intelligence for Your Life TV, debuted in syndication to local stations. In April 2016, the TV program was seen on 174 stations. The series also features health segments hosted by his wife, Connie Sellecca, based on her own radio program, "Intelligence for Your Health".

Tesh also authored a book, Intelligence for Your Life: Powerful Lessons for Personal Growth, in 2008, reprinted in 2012 (publisher Thomas Nelson).

Personal life
Tesh has been married to actress Connie Sellecca since 1992. They have one daughter together named Prima. His wife also has a son named Gib, with actor Gil Gerard, who now appears on some of Tesh's radio and TV programs. Tesh and Sellecca reside in Los Angeles.
In the 1970s, he also briefly dated Oprah Winfrey.
Tesh is a Christian. He was raised a Baptist and was involved in the church during his youth. He played organ, sang in the choir, and went to church camp. He became inactive in the church during his adult life, but became involved again after his future wife introduced him to pastor Louis Lapides. Since then, he has written and performed Christian music.

Awards
During his early career as a television journalist in the 1970s, Tesh received an Associated Press award for investigative journalism.  In 2018 John Tesh was inducted into the North Carolina Music Hall of Fame. In 2019 he was inducted into the National Radio Hall of Fame. In 2007, Tesh won the Syndicated Personality/Show of the Year award by Radio & Records magazine for his radio show. Other finalists included Delilah, Blair Garner, Steve Harvey, Kidd Kraddick, and The Lia Show. Tesh was nominated in 2003 for the Grammy for "Best Pop Instrumental Album" for Power of Love.  John has also earned three gold albums, six Emmys for his sports themes, and a Keyboard Magazine Award.

Discography

Studio albums
 1987: Music from the Tour de France, Vol. I (Tesh Music BMI)
 1988: Tour de France (Private Music)
 1989: Garden City (Cypress)
 1992: A Romantic Christmas (Decca)
 1992: Ironman Triathlon (GTSP)
 1992: Music in the Key of Love (GTSP)
 1992: The Games (GTSP)
 1993: Monterey Nights (GTSP)
 1993: Winter Song (GTSP)  1994: (Decca)
 1994: A Family Christmas (Decca)
 1994: Sax by the Fire (Decca)
 1995: Sax on the Beach (Decca)
 1996: Discovery (Decca)
 1996: Choirs of Christmas (GTSP)
 1997: Avalon (Decca)
 1997: Sax All Night (Decca)
 1998: Grand Passion (GTSP)
 1998: Guitar by the Fire (Decca)
 1998: Songs from the Road (BMG)
 1998: Pure Movies (GTSP)
 1999: One World (GTSP)
 1999: John Tesh & Friends (Columbia River)
 2000: Pure Hymns (Faith MD)
 2000: Pure Movies, Vol. 2 (Garden City)
 2001: Pure Orchestra (Garden City)
 2001: Pure Gospel (Faith MD)
 2001: Classical Music for an Intimate Mood (Garden City)
 2001: Classical Music for a Stress-Free World (Garden City)
 2001: Classical Music for Babies (and Their Moms) Vol. 1 & 2 (Garden City)
 2001: Classical Music for a Prayerful Mood (Garden City & Faith MD)
 2002: Awesome God (Garden City)
 2002: The Power of Love (Garden City)
 2002: Christmas Worship (Word)
 2002: A Deeper Faith (Garden City)
 2002: God of Wonders (Garden City)
 2002: Worship God (Garden City)
 2003: A Deeper Faith, Vol. 2 (Garden City)
 2007: A Passionate Life (Garden City)
 2008: Grand Piano Christmas (Garden City)
 2009: Grand Piano Worship (Garden City)
 2010: Grand Piano Romance (Garden City)
 2011: Big Band Christmas (Garden City)
 2012: Big Band (Garden City)

Live albums
 1995: Live at Red Rocks (Decca)
 2004: Worship at Red Rocks (live) (Garden City)
 2005: Red Rocks Platinum (live) (Garden City)
 2008: Alive: Music & Dance (Garden City)
 2020: Songs and Stories from the Grand Piano (Garden City)

Compilations and collections
 1990: Tour de France – The Early Years (Private Music)
 1993: Monterey Nights (Decca)
 1995: Anthology
 1997: Victory – the sports collection (GTSP)
 1999: Heart of the Sunrise - The Millennium Collection (John Tesh)
 1999: One Day (Unison)
 2000: Pure Hymns (Faith MD)
 2000: Forever More: The Greatest Hits of John Tesh (Decca)
 2003: Worship Collection: Awesome God (Garden City)
 2009: The Best of Christmas
 2009: John Tesh – Greatest Hits – Live in Concert Vol. 1 CD/DVD (Garden City)

Singles 
 1988: A Thousand Summers (single) 
 1989: You Break It (Atlantic) (single)

Other albums 
 1995: Backstage with John Tesh (Digital Entertainment) (an interactive CD-rom) 
 2005: Drive Time Intelligence (26 tracks of Intelligence For Your Life on the go, plus 3 bonus music tracks) 
 2010: God of Wonders (Word)

Videography
 1993: A Romantic Christmas
 1995: Live in Monterey
 1995: Live at Red Rocks
 1997: The Avalon Concert
 2000: One World
 2002: Christmas Worship
 2004: Worship at Red Rocks
 2008: Alive: Music & Dance
 2009: Greatest Hits: Live in Concert, Vol. 1
 2012: Big Band Live
 2020: Songs and Stories from the Grand Piano

References

External links

 
 Official music website
 
 John Tesh at Allmovie 
 
 

20th-century American pianists
North Carolina State University alumni
NC State Wolfpack men's lacrosse players
People from Garden City, New York
Living people
1952 births
American Christians
American male composers
20th-century American composers
Composers for piano
American radio personalities
New-age pianists
Olympic Games broadcasters
Promise Keepers
American television sports announcers
American performers of Christian music
American YouTubers
Video bloggers
American podcasters
Cycling announcers
Gymnastics broadcasters
Private Music artists
American male pianists
21st-century American pianists
Male bloggers
20th-century American male musicians
21st-century American male musicians
Garden City High School (New York) alumni